A drumhead is a membrane stretched over one or both of the open ends of a drum.

Drumhead may also refer to:

 Drumhead (sign), a type of circular sign that was used on many railroads
 Drumhead court-martial, a court-martial which takes place on the battlefield
 "The Drumhead," an episode of Star Trek: The Next Generation
 Drumhead, a drumming magazine
 Drumhead, Nova Scotia
 Eardrum, the membrane present in the ear.

See also
 Drum (disambiguation)
 Head (disambiguation)